Pennsylvania Highlands may refer to:
Pennsylvania Highlands Community College, a community college and vocational school with two branches located in Johnstown and Ebensburg, Pennsylvania
Pennsylvania Highlands Region, a region in a section of the Appalachian Mountains located in Eastern Pennsylvania